Mount Scenery is an active volcano in the Caribbean Netherlands. Its lava dome forms the summit of the Saba island stratovolcano.

The Saba volcano is potentially dangerous; the latest eruption was in or around the year 1640 and included explosions and pyroclastic flows.

On 2 September 2019, Mt. Scenery Nature Park was elevated to the status of national park.

It has a hiking trail to its summit, which is one of Saba's biggest tourist attractions. Along the way up the mountain can be found all of the climate zones on Saba, including a cloud forest at the summit.

See also
 List of volcanoes in the Netherlands
 Vaalserberg - the highest point in the Netherlands in Europe

References

Volcanoes of the Atlantic Ocean
Volcanoes of the Netherlands
Potentially active volcanoes
Landforms of Saba
Highest points of countries